Justin Inacio (born November 6, 1998) is a Canadian professional lacrosse player who plays as a faceoff specialist with the Archers Lacrosse Club of the Premier Lacrosse League (PLL). He was drafted by the Calgary Roughnecks of the National Lacrosse League (NLL) 10th overall in the first round of the 2021 NLL Entry Draft as a defenceman.

For college, Inacio played midfield for the Ohio State Buckeyes men's lacrosse team. In 2018, he was the Big Ten Freshman of the Year.

In October 2022, Inacio was invited to the evaluation camp to make the Canada men's national lacrosse team for the 2023 World Lacrosse Championship.

Statistics

NCAA

PLL

References 

1998 births
Living people
Canadian lacrosse players
Lacrosse defenders
Ohio State Buckeyes men's lacrosse players
Sportspeople from Oakville, Ontario